Takao Iijima (born May 19, 1931), better known by his art name Ay-O, (靉嘔 Ai Ō), is a Japanese avant-garde visual and performance artist who has been associated with Fluxus since its international beginnings in the 1960s.

Biography

Early life and education

Ay-O was born Iijima Takao in Ibaraki prefecture in 1931. He studied art at Tokyo University of Education.

From Demokrato to Fluxus
Ay-O started his career in the Demokrato Artists Association (デモクラート美術家協会), along with artists Ei-Q and On Kawara and the photographer Eikoh Hosoe (Demokrato is Esperanto for "democratic). This association promoted artistic freedom and independence in making art. The influence of these values on Ay-O can be seen in a series of early paintings over which he painted a large X because he thought they were not original enough. Another independent movement was close to Demokrato in Japan: Sōzō Biiku (創造美育) by the collector Sadajirō Kubo (久保貞次郞）promoting nurturing freedom when teaching art. Both movements started in Fukui Prefecture in Japan and explain the special bond Ay-O developed with the place. Sōzō Biiku's approach challenges the traditional Japanese Master-Student relationship. As such, like naive art, the movement promotes ways independent to the culturally established ones. Kubo also created the "Small Collector Society" (小コレクターの会) to spread art collection in society.

In 1955, Ay-O founded a group called Jitsuzonsha ("The Existentialists") along with printmaker and writer Masuo Ikeda, artist Hiroshi Manabe, and others. The group staged three exhibitions before dissolving. Some of Ay-O's works from this period show an influence from Fernand Léger with massive bodies on the canvas, such as the  Pastoral (Den'en) from 1956. Working closely with Ikeda piqued Ay-O's interest in printmaking, which he would carry with him the rest of his career. Also this period inspired Ay-O's (靉嘔) to pick the title of Sartre's novel as his name (see below).

In 1958, Ay-O relocated to New York City. In 1961, Yoko Ono introduced him to George Maciunas of Fluxus, and Ay-O formally joined Fluxus in 1963. As a member of Fluxus, Ay-O was known for his Finger Boxes series and his performance events. He worked closely with fellow Fluxus artists Maciunas, Emmett Williams, Dick Higgins, and Nam June Paik. Ay-O and Nam June Paik were roommates and became friends in the Soho Fluxus coop.

The Rainbow Artist
Ay-O established a reputation in the avant-gardes of Japan, Europe and the United States. In Japan, he is known as the "Rainbow Man" for his use of colorful, rainbow-striped motifs in his artwork. In its purest form, some paintings are simple gradations of the rainbow, with up to 192 gradations.

 

Ay-O represented Japan at the Venice Biennale in 1966 and at the São Paulo Biennale in 1971. He also built the famed "Tactile Rainbow Room" at the Osaka World's Fair in 1970. In 1971, true to his Demokato debut, he adapted 10 American Naïve paintings and created a rainbow version that he called Nashville Skyline. Ay-O's attachment to Douanier Rousseau's work is another proof of his interest for naïve art. In 1987 he did a series of Rainbow Happenings, with Rainbow Happening #17 being a 300m Rainbow Eiffel Tower project in Paris. As a rainbow artist Ay-O's work embraces abstraction more decisively than in his previous period, and human form when present in a rainbow context becomes itself abstract. One special work from the period 8:15 A.M. (1988),  done for Hiroshima's MOCA represents the explosion with his  Rainbow palette.

Recent activities 
One of his projects in the west was a Collective Portrait of George Maciuanas, that he co-edited with Emmett Williams and Ann Noel. In the recent decade Ay-O has exhibited regularly at the Emily Harvey Gallery in (1996, 2001) and Gallery Itsutsuji (1996,2005,2007,2012) and Gallery Goto (1999,2004) in Japan. In Japan Ay-O is part of the collection of the National Museum of Modern Art in Tokyo and Kyoto (see 2005 Tokyo exhibition in the links). In 2001 Ay-O had a room in the special exhibit "La fluxus Constellation" in the Museum of Contemporary Art in Genoa. He was also represented in various other Fluxus exhibitions around the world as "Centraal Fluxus Festival" Centraal Museum, Utrecht (2003),  "Fluxus & Non Fluxus Fluxus" Randers kunstmuseum (2006).  Being present at both the Venice Biennale in 1966 and at the São Paulo Biennale in 1971, Ay-O was one of the "Twelve Japanese Artists from the Venice Biennale 1952-2001," in Art Tower Mito ATM, Mito. At the Mori Art Museum, Tokyo, Ay-O was part of two exhibitions: "Tokyo-Berlin / Berlin-Tokyo" in 2005 and "All about laughter" in 2007. The MOMA also has several posts about Ay-O : One about his return to Tokyo in 1966 after 8 years in NY , a few about Japanese contributions to the Fluxus movement , or more generally Fluxus where Ay-O is present . Finally in 2012 the MUSEUM OF CONTEMPORARY ART TOKYO (MOT) showed a large retrospective exhibition: "Over the Rainbow once more.   This was followed by the retrospective being shown at the Hiroshima City Museum of Contemporary Art through to 14.1.2013.. The 300m Rainbow from Happening #17 was part of the show . Hiroshima's MOCA exhibit was the occasion of one more happening performed by Ay-O and his team : a Fluxus revival performance, succession of 30 shorts representing each a different Fluxus artists . This was Ay-O's way to celebrate the 50th birthday of Fluxus, and a Japanese echo the Wiesbaden events . In 2012 the MOMA produced an exhibit titled : Tokyo 1955-1970 Avant Garde where Ay-O's work in that period are presented. 
.

Fukui (2006) and Japan (2012) Retrospective
Ay-O did his most complete retrospective exhibitions in Japan - first in the Fukui Art Museum in 2006 organized the first retrospective. This exhibition was the occasion for the artist to write a bilingual book "Over the Rainbow, Ay-O Retrospective 1950-2006," in which he provides an overview of his work. In 2012 similar retrospective augmented by recent works "Ay-O: Over the Rainbow Once More" is shown in various locations in Japan (e.g.) - the inaugural exhibit was in the Tokyo MOT . The catalog of the 2012 exhibits clarifies a few points of the reference book from the 2006 exhibit.

Finger boxes

The Finger Boxes are works of art by Ay-O that are the most tactile works of art in the Fluxus project. Ay-O first produced them in 1964. There are rumors that they  were invented before WWII, however this is unconfirmed. It is said that all of the original Finger Boxes were destroyed during the fighting. Ay-O is said to have learned of this and claimed the invention for himself. The artworks comprise largely identical hollow cubical wooden boxes with finger-sized holes in one face. As tactile works of art, it is necessary to touch them to perceive them, by placing one's finger into the hole to feel the material that is hidden within the box. The hidden contents of the boxes comprise such various things as beads, bristle brushes, hair, cotton balls, nails, and sponges.

The artist's intent, by including things such as nails, which can potentially prick the finger, in the possible contents of the box is to ensure that the user touches the box with an "enquiring, learning gesture". The finger boxes are also intended to be touched by multiple people at a time, promoting a shared, social, experience of perceiving the work.

Several versions of the Finger Box exist, including one set of boxes in a briefcase (entitled Finger Box (valise edition)) which is in the Gilbert and Lila Silverman Fluxus Collection in Detroit, and a version (included in Fluxus I) that uses sealed envelopes that have been slit open instead of boxes.

In the 2012 Japan retrospective, "Over the Rainbow once More" - a larger work is presented around the finger boxes—it is a cubic room in which the viewer/toucher enters. The wall of this room is paved with square rainbow motifs - where concentric squares with the colors of the rainbow are painted around a hole in the wall. Behind each hole a finger box has been appended on the other side.

Prints
True to his Japanese beginning and the Democrato movement Ay-O took some special care to produce print version of his work. Some of his work exist both as oil on Canvas and print (96 gradations for example). Ay-O  personally gets involved in the process. Examples can be seen here . Prints are a way to paint rainbows as one. In a way similar to the execution of the Nashville Skyline (where the color was applied by others), Ay-O use number coding to communicate with his printers, 12 is lemon yellow, 1 red, 24 purple. The rainbow is then the consecutive integers.  In prints inspired from the shunga tradition, as for example `Ten komanda no zu, kōbutsu 十開の圖　虹佛 (Depiction of the Ten Commandments, Rainbow Buddha) ' Rainbow Hokusai, 1970,  from the British Museum Collection , the printing technique assembles 54 separate square cards, each printed with part of the design.

Happenings

Happenings are a tradition from the Fluxus movement. Many fluxus members organise or participate in such happenings. One remembers Piano Activities and Yoko Ono Cut Piece.  Ay-O  has participated and organised such happenings since the 1960s and continues until recent times. The early happenings were all over the world. In New-York (1965) in Flux Hall "Memoriam of Adriano Olivetti,"  "Rainbow Staircase Environment, 363 Canal Street, New York, November 20" , "Rainbow Music #1," Tokyo (1966) "Happening for a sightseeing bus trip in Tokyo" with its movie on the Museum of Modern Art website , Fukui (1986) Rainbow Happening #16, a 25-meter rainbow in the Eiheiji Temple, Paris (1987) Rainbow Happening #17. A happening was part of his 2012 retrospective, and for the Rainbow Dinner the same year.  Organised by Ay-O the rainbow pro-eminently figures in such happenings. In both the 2006  and the 2012 retrospectives some theme mixing traditional fluxus themes (like 'One for Violin' executed in 2006 by Nam June Paik) - a portable and explosive version of Piano Activities   and Ay-o specific themes are present.

Kappa and Aztec Faces, kind monsters 

As can be seen on some of his T-shirts, Ay-O likes to identify with a mythological creature from Japanese Folklore. The name of the creature is Kappa. You can see this figure in his art - almost as a self portrait, and recognise it by the water on top of the creature's skull.

Another figure used by Ay-O is the Aztec face used in the 1965 Fluxorchestra concert at Carnegie recital used by Hall Maciunas. This face with the tongue extended became almost a logo for the fluxus movement. Sometimes the Kappa persona appears in works like in these 'fluxus masks' where Ay-o by the simple application of his rainbow palette assimilates a traditional Aztec face into contemporary art. . Those Aztec faces in spite of his fierce independence (or maybe through it) mark Ay-o's allegiance to the wider fluxus movement .

Signatures

Ay-O has several phases with different signatures. In older works in the 1950s the signature is mostly and traditionally written in plain letters with the date as for example in the 1955 signature.

At the same time in the pre-rainbow period some of the painting were frequently done on wood and the signature is sometime etched in the wood.
In this 1954 example it is etched as 'O ai'.

With arrival of the rainbow period in the 1980s some new signature is introduced where the O encircles the other letter in a cartouche-like manner like in this example of 1985 on one of the large 96 gradations work.

 Last but not least the rainbow artist developed his 'signature signature': the rainbow signature used mostly for autographs and paper. This is one of his mini happenings. To produce it AY-O puts felt-pin pens in his fist with all colors of the rainbow and signs with it  as can be seen in this picture of a book signed with the rainbow signature.

On paper Ay-O signs using roman letters and his kanji (靉嘔). As for the origin of the name from Ay-O's own and most recent retrospective catalog "Over the rainbow once more" (2012), page 75: "Ay-O, an unusual pseudonym for a Japanese, was conceived during Ay-O's third year at Tokyo Kyoiku University, when he had his friends choose then favorite sounds from the Japanese syllabary A, I, U, E and O. The result: 'AIO.' To express this name, he selected the kanji character 'ai,' from aitai (靉靆) meaning a scene of drifting clouds, and the kanji character 'ou' (long 'o') from the title of Jean-Paul Sartre's novel.

Publications
 Mr. Fluxus: A Collective Portrait of George Maciunas 1931–1978, Thames & Hudson, 1998
 Niji: Ai O hanga zen sakuhinshu, 1954–1979, Published in English by Sobunsha
 Ouzel, Chikumasyobo Publishing, 1978
 Ay-O, Over the Rainbow, Ay-O Retrospective 1950-2006 (174 pages), Bijutsu Shuppan-Sha (:ja:美術出版社), 2006
 Ay-O, Ay-O over the Rainbow once more, 2012

References

Citations

Bibliography
 Rainbow Rainbow prints, Catalogue raisonne, Abe Shuppan, Co, 2000
 Japan Quarterly, Asahi Shinbunsha eds, 1973,v. 20 p187 and v.22-23 1975-1976 p286
 Caroline Parsons, People the Japanese Know, Japan Times eds, 127 pages, 1989
 Fondation du Doute 

 Leigh Landy, Technology, Avant Garde collection (Interdisciplinary and International Series), p 23, 1992

 Owen Smith, Fluxus: The History of an Attitude, San Diego State University Press, 1999
 Midori Yoshimoto Into Performance: Japanese Women Artists In New York, p41 and p118, Rutgers University Press, 2005

External links
Archivio Conz
Ay-O, Oral History
 Ay-O at the Tokyo MOT
 Rainbow Manifesto by Ay-O
Fluxfriends
 "The New Japan" by David Elliott
 Twelve Japanese Artists from the Venice Biennale 1952-2001
 Fukuoka Museum
  Fluxus: Art in Life, Urawa Art Museum 
 Fluxus: From Art to the Mundane, Urawa Museum
The Lavenberg Collection of Japanese Prints
The varied colors of artistic process, Japan Times
 2006 retrospective, Fukui museum
  Over the Rainbow Once more, MOT Tokyo (2012)
MOT Pamphlet
  Over the Rainbow Once more, MOCA Hiroshima (2012)
 2012 "Tokyo 1955-1970 Avant-Garde," MOMA

Japanese painters
Fluxus
1931 births
Living people
University of Tsukuba alumni